Quararibea asterolepis (cinco dedos, guácimo molenillo, guayabillo, garrocho, molenillo, panula, palo cuadrado; syn. Quararibea stenophylla Pittier) is a timber tree native to  Brazil, Colombia, Costa Rica, Ecuador, Panama, Peru, and Venezuela. This plant can be used for cellulose production.

External links
Quararibea asterolepis
  Quararibea asterolepis

asterolepis
Trees of Brazil
Trees of Colombia
Trees of Costa Rica
Trees of Ecuador
Trees of Panama
Trees of Peru
Trees of Venezuela